Fantamady Keita (born 25 September 1949) is a Malian former professional footballer who played as a striker. A Malian international, he was the leading scorer in the 1972 African Cup of Nations, scoring five goals as Mali reached the final.

Career
Keita began his playing career with AS Real Bamako, before he went on to spend three years (1972–1975) in France with Stade Rennais. He also had a spells with AS Angoulême and ECAC Chaumont.

In 2006, he was selected by CAF as one of the best 200 African football players of the last 50 years.

References

1949 births
Living people
Sportspeople from Bamako
Association football forwards
Malian footballers
Malian expatriate footballers
Mali international footballers
1972 African Cup of Nations players
Ligue 1 players
Segunda División players
AS Real Bamako players
Stade Rennais F.C. players
Angoulême Charente FC players
Chaumont FC players
Malian expatriate sportspeople in France
Expatriate footballers in France
Malian expatriate sportspeople in Spain
Expatriate footballers in Spain
21st-century Malian people